Stir the Blood is the third studio album by New York-based rock band The Bravery. The album was released on December 1, 2009, and features the singles "Slow Poison" and "I Am Your Skin".

Production
To record the album, the band had to leave New York behind and head upstate and into the woods. The group set up shop for Stir the Blood at Dreamland Recording: a recording facility in an old 1800s church which, years ago, housed the Pixies for an unnamed project and The B-52's as they recorded "Love Shack". There, as most of the band came in and out, Endicott stayed in a neighboring house for several months as he helmed the producer's desk for the new record, alongside John Hill (Santigold and Shakira, for example). Songs like "Slow Poison", "She's So Bendable", "I Am Your Skin" and "Hatef--k" came about as Endicott picked through riffs recorded here and there from the band's tour in support of 2007's The Sun and the Moon. Endicott claims "there is a dark tone to this album" and that "there's an angry undertone to it". "I was pretty pissed off when I wrote a lot of the songs", says Endicott. He also claims that while the lyrics, which also focus on "intimacy", may be dark, the music stays upbeat.

Singles/music videos
The first single released, "Slow Poison", has reached numbers 24 and 40 on the US alternative songs and rock songs charts.

The second single, "I Am Your Skin", was released in November 2009 on iTunes.

A music video for the song "Hatef--k" was released in October 2009.

A music video for the song "Slow Poison" was released in November 2009.

A music video for the song "Sugar Pill" was also released in November 2009.

Album art
The cover of the album features a detail from 'Carrion Call' by British artist Polly Morgan.

Track listing
All tracks written and composed by Sam Endicott, except where noted.
"Adored" – 3:42
"Song for Jacob" – 3:23
"Slow Poison" – 3:31
"Hatef--k" – 2:55
"I Am Your Skin" – 3:01
"She's So Bendable" (M. Hindert) – 2:21
"The Spectator" – 3:50
"I Have Seen the Future" – 3:15
"Red Hands and White Knuckles" – 3:21
"Jack-O'-Lantern Man" – 2:50
"Sugar Pill" – 3:17

Best Buy bonus tracks
"Slow Poison" (Villains Remix)
"Slow Poison" (Drop the Lime Remix)
"Slow Poison" (Of Montreal Remix)

iTunes bonus tracks
"Slow Poison" (Lego My Echo Remix)
"Slow Poison" (Roy G and the Biv Remix)

Personnel
Sam Endicott - lead vocals, rhythm guitar
Michael Zakarin - lead guitar, backing vocals
John Conway - keyboards, backing vocals
Mike Hindert - bass, backing vocals
Anthony Burulcich - drums, backing vocals

References

2009 albums
Island Records albums
The Bravery albums